This article details the qualifying phase for fencing at the 2024 Summer Olympics. The competition will comprise a total of 212 fencers, with an equal distribution between men and women, coming from the different NOCs, similar to the Tokyo 2020 roster size. Qualified NOCs can enter a maximum of eighteen fencers (nine per gender), with each consisting of a trio, whether men's or women's, across all weapon-based team events (foil, épée, and sabre).

About two-thirds of the total quota will be attributed to the world's top fencers based on the points accrued in the Fédération Internationale d'Escrime (FIE) Official Ranking between April 3, 2023 and April 1, 2024, with further individual places available at each of the four zonal qualifying tournaments (Africa, Asia & Oceania, Europe, and the Americas). 

The team events will offer eight to nine spots for all registered NOCs competing in each weapon. Each team must be composed of three fencers (or a fencing trio). The top four teams in each weapon will qualify directly for the Games, with the next set of places assigned to the highest-ranked nation from each of the continental zones (Africa, Asia & Oceania, Europe, and the Americas) between fifth and sixteenth position. If a zone does not field any teams within the specific ranking (from fifth to sixteenth place), the top-ranked team eligible for qualification will secure a spot irrespective of the continent.

For the individual events, quota places vary from a minimum of 34 to a maximum of 37. With the team members directly entered into their respective individual competitions, six more places will be awarded to the eligible fencers based on the FIE Adjusted Official Ranking list by the continental zone of April 1, 2024:  the top two fencers each from Europe and Asia & Oceania; and the highest-ranked fencer each from the Americas and Africa. The zonal qualifying tournaments will offer four available spots with one each to the NOCs without a qualified fencer, male or female, in one or more weapons by the two previous pathways.

Host nation France reserves six fencing spots to be distributed between the team and individual events apart from the qualified fencers through the pathways mentioned above, respecting the maximum quota of athletes per NOC (three per weapon). If the French fencers qualified directly for the team event, they can use two quota places if the NOC contains a single qualified fencer in a corresponding individual event; or three if none of them compete in a corresponding individual event. Two further spots, along with those unused by the host country, will be attributed to the eligible NOCs interested to have their fencers compete in Paris under the Universality rules, respecting the 37-fencer limit for each weapon-based individual event.

Timeline

Qualification summary

Men's events

Men's épée

Men's team épée

Men's foil

Men's team foil

Men's sabre

Men's team sabre

Women's events

Women's épée

Women's team épée

Women's foil

Women's team foil

Women's sabre

Women's team sabre

References

Fencing at the 2024 Summer Olympics
Qualification for the 2024 Summer Olympics
2023 in fencing